The Saladin or Salah Al-Din Governorate is one of Iraq's 19 governorates, north of Baghdad. It is made up of 8 districts, with the capital being Tikrit. Before 1976 the province was part of Baghdad Governorate.

The province is named after the Kurdish Muslim leader Saladin or Salah ad Din, who hailed from the province. The province is also known as the home of Saddam Hussein, who was from the village of Al-Awja.

Overview

Saladin Governorate contains a number of important religious and cultural sites. Samarra, the governorate's largest city, is home to both the Al-Askari Shrine (an important religious site in Shia Islam where the 10th and 11th Shia Imams are buried), the Sardab where the 12th Imam al-Mahdi went into occultation, and the Great Mosque of Samarra with its distinctive Malwiya minaret. It also contains an old Zengid mosque.

Samarra was the capital of the Abbasid Caliphate in the 9th century CE, and today Abbasid Samarra is a UNESCO World Heritage Site. 

The ancient Neo-Assyrian Empire Assyrian city of Assur is located in Al-Shirqat District on the banks of the Tigris River. Other sites in the governorate include the Crusader Dome (القبة الصلبية) north of Samarra and the Al-`Ashaq Palace (قصر العاشق). Today, the Saladin Governorate has a diverse population of Arabs, Kurds, Turkmens and Assyrians.

In January 2014, there were plans announced by Prime Minister Nouri al-Maliki to make the Tuz Khurmatu district into a new governorate due to its Turkmen majority. However, these plans were not implemented.

Autonomy
In October 2011, the governorate's administration declared itself a semi-autonomous region, explaining that the declaration was in response to the central government's "domination over the provincial council authorities". Saladin, which is a largely Sunni governorate, is also hoping that by declaring themselves an autonomous region within Iraq, it will entail them to a larger portion of government funding. The council cited "article 119 of Iraq's constitution" in its call for autonomy, which states that "one or more governorates [provinces] shall have the right to organize into a region" if one third of the Provincial Council members or one tenth of the voters request to form a region".

Provincial government
Governor: Raed al-Jabouri
Deputy Governor: Ammar Hikmat
Provincial Council Chairman: Ahmed Abdel-Jabbar al-Karim

Districts 

 Al-Daur District (Al-Daur)
 Al-Shirqat District (Al-Shirqat)
 Baiji District (Baiji)
 Balad District (Balad)
 Samarra District (Samarra)
 Tikrit District (Tikrit)
 Tooz District (Tuz Khurmatu)
 Dujail District (Dujail)

Towns and cities 
Tikrit
Baiji
Balad
Samarra
Dujail
Al-Dour
Yathrib
Al-Shirqat
Sulaiman Bek
Yankjah
Tuz Khurmatu
Al Ishaqi
Amirli
Al Seniyah
Al Dhuluiya
Sa'ad (Iraq)
Al-Faris (Bamerni)
Al-Hajaj

Population
The following table shows the populations of the districts of Saladin Governorate, according to the United Nations in 2003.  No data is available for Dujail District.

See also 

Assur
Tigris River

References

External links
Article and video on civilians massacre on BBC News.
"3 U.S. soldiers charged with killing of Iraqis" on CNN.

 
Governorates of Iraq
Saladin
1976 establishments in Iraq
States and territories established in 1975